Rex Samuel Sellers  (born 11 November 1950) is a yachtman from New Zealand. He won a gold medal in the 1984 Summer Olympics in Los Angeles, and a silver medal in the 1988 Summer Olympics in Seoul, both in the Tornado class with Chris Timms. He also competed in the Tornado class with Brian Jones at the 1992 and 1996 Olympics, where they finished fourth and 15th respectively. Sellers and Gerald Sly were selected to sail in the Tornado class for New Zealand at the 1980 Olympic Games in Moscow, but did not compete because of the US-led boycott.

Sellers attended Nelson College from 1965 to 1967. He was appointed a Member of the New Zealand Order of Merit in the 2010 New Year Honours, for services to yachting.

References

External links
 
 
 
 
 

1950 births
Living people
Sportspeople from Nelson, New Zealand
Members of the New Zealand Order of Merit
New Zealand male sailors (sport)
Sailors at the 1984 Summer Olympics – Tornado
Sailors at the 1988 Summer Olympics – Tornado
Sailors at the 1992 Summer Olympics – Tornado
Sailors at the 1996 Summer Olympics – Tornado
People educated at Nelson College
Olympic gold medalists for New Zealand in sailing
Olympic silver medalists for New Zealand
Medalists at the 1988 Summer Olympics
Medalists at the 1984 Summer Olympics